Medicus Mundi International (MMI) is a Network of public interest organisations working in the field of international health cooperation and advocacy. The Network members fight global poverty by promoting access to health and health care as a fundamental human right (“Health for All”). The Network aims at enhancing the quality and effectiveness of the work of its members and their partners through sharing know-how and joining forces. Key fields of joint activity include global health policy and governance (MMI is an organization in official relations with the World Health Organization) and the improvement of legitimacy, relevance and effectiveness of international health cooperation.

Network Members
The MMI Network has the following member organisations:
 Africa Christian Health Associations Platform, ACHAP, Kenya
 action medeor, Germany
 AMCES, Benin
 Community Working Group on Health, Zimbabwe
 Cordaid, The Netherlands
 Doctors with Africa CUAMM, Italy
 Ecumenical Pharmaceutical Network EPN, Kenya
 Emergenza Sorrisi, Italy
 Escuela Andaluza de Salud Pública EASP, Spain
 Health Poverty Action, United Kingdom
 Institute of Tropical Medicine Antwerp, Belgium
 i+solutions, The Netherlands
 Medico international, Germany
 Medics without Vacation, Belgium
 Medicus Mundi Italy
 Medicus Mundi Switzerland, Network Health for All
 Medicus Mundi Spain
 Memisa, Belgium
 plan:g – partnership for global health, Austria
 Redemptoris Missio, Medicus Mundi Poland
 Wemos Foundation, The Netherlands

MMI ePlatform
 Medicus Mundi International Network

References

Medical and health organisations based in Switzerland
International medical and health organizations
Basel